Pedro Duhart, also known as Pierre (5 April 1909 – 30 November 1955) was a footballer who played international football for both Uruguay and France. He played as a striker for Nacional, Sochaux and Charleville.

Personal life
Duhart was born in Uruguay and was of French descent.

References

1909 births
1955 deaths
Footballers from Montevideo
Uruguayan footballers
Uruguay international footballers
French footballers
France international footballers
Uruguayan people of French descent
Uruguayan emigrants to France
Dual internationalists (football)
Club Nacional de Football players
FC Sochaux-Montbéliard players
OFC Charleville players
Ligue 1 players
Ligue 2 players
Association football forwards